Kingda Ka is a  hydraulically-launched steel roller coaster located at Six Flags Great Adventure in Jackson, New Jersey, United States. It is the second strata coaster ever built, exceeding  in height, and the last to remain in operation after Top Thrill Dragster closed in 2022. Both share similar designs, although Kingda Ka's layout adds an airtime hill on the return portion of the track.

History
On September 29, 2004, it was announced that Kingda Ka would be added to the Six Flags Great Adventure amusement park in 2005. This announcement occurred at an event held for roller coaster enthusiasts and the media. The ride would be part of the Golden Kingdom, an  themed area being developed at Six Flags Great Adventure. Six Flags CEO Kieran Burke said: "This is the first step in a process of really transforming Six Flags Great Adventure from the largest regional theme park in the world to a true regional destination."

Intamin subcontracted Stakotra to assist with construction. On January 13, 2005, workers completed Kingda Ka's tower with a topping out ceremony. For the ceremony, one 50-story crane was used to hoist two workers to the top of the ride; another crane lifted a  steel beam, with an American flag, to the ride's pinnacle. The ride was still under construction when the park opened for the season in March 2005. The attraction was originally scheduled to open on April 23, 2005, but its opening was delayed to May 21, as the park stated that more time was needed to complete testing. A media event was held two days prior on May 19, 2005.

Upon its opening, Kingda Ka became the tallest and fastest roller coaster in the world, taking both world records from Top Thrill Dragster at Cedar Point. Intamin designed both Kingda Ka and Top Thrill Dragster, and the two share a similar design and layout that differs primarily by the theme and the additional hill featured on Kingda Ka. Both rides were built by Stakotra and installed by Martin & Vleminckx. Though Kingda Ka was popular among both the general public and roller coaster enthusiasts, its use of relatively new technology meant that Six Flags Great Adventure had to hire a dedicated maintenance team for the ride. Because of maintenance issues, the ride was closed for almost two months during its first season, and it was closed for an additional three weeks at the beginning of the 2006 season. Kingda Ka continued to be the world's fastest coaster until Formula Rossa at Ferrari World opened in November 2010. 

On August 29, 2013, Six Flags Great Adventure officially announced Zumanjaro: Drop of Doom for the 2014 season. The new attraction was attached to the Kingda Ka coaster. The drop tower features three gondolas integrated into the existing structure which was also built by Intamin. Kingda Ka closed at the start of the 2014 season in order to construct Zumanjaro: Drop of Doom on to Kingda Ka. Kingda Ka reopened on weekends on Memorial Day Weekend and fully reopened when Zumanjaro: Drop of Doom was completed on July 4, 2014.

Ride experience

Queue
Guests pass under the jungle-themed entrance sign and enter the queue line, which is surrounded by bamboo, which augments the jungle-themed music that plays in the background. Along the way, there are safety and warning signs about the ride. Following a long straight section, guests turn left and head into a switchback section. Guests walk through some curved paths before entering the station.

Layout

After the train has been locked and checked, it moves slowly out of the station to the launch area, then passes through a switch track which allows four trains on two tracks to load simultaneously. When the signal is given to launch, the train rolls back slightly so that the catch car can latch on to the middle car, and the brakes retract on the launch track. As the brake fins are retracting, a recording announces: "Arms down, head back, hold on!" The train is launched approximately five seconds later.

The hydraulic launch motor is capable of producing 20,800 peak horsepower (15.5 MW). It then descends  straight down through a 270-degree, clockwise spiral. The ride lasts 28 seconds from the start of the launch.

Trains and station
Kingda Ka's four trains are color-coded for easy identification (green, dark blue, teal, and orange) and are numbered; the four colors are also used for the seats and restraints. Each train seats 18 people (two per row). The rear car has one row, while the rest have two. The rear row of each car is positioned higher than its front row for better visibility.

Each of Kingda Ka's trains has an extra row of seat mounts. The panels could be removed for the installation of additional seats in the future. This modification would increase the capacity of each train from 18 to 20, and the hourly capacity of the coaster from 1400 to 1600 riders per hour. Kingda Ka's station is prepared for this modification, with entrance gates for the currently-nonexistent row of seats. Kingda Ka's over-the-shoulder restraint system consists of a thick, rigid lap bar and two thinner, flexible over-the-shoulder restraints.

Kingda Ka's station has two parallel tracks, with switch tracks at the entrance and exit. Each of the station's tracks is designed to accommodate two trains, so each of the four trains can be operated from its own station. Because all of Kingda Ka's trains are mechanically identical and able to load and unload at each of the four individual station bays, the original plan was for all trains to operate at the same time, and for each train to load and unload at its own station. Trains on one side would be loaded while trains on the other side would be launched with an employee directing riders in line to a particular side, where they could then choose to sit anywhere within the train.

Kingda Ka's music is by Safri Duo; almost their entire Episode II album is played in the queue and station. Survivor's "Eye of the Tiger", played by DJ Quicksilver, may also be heard in the queue and station.

Theme
Kingda Ka is located in the jungle-themed area of the park known as The Golden Kingdom. The ride portrays a mythical Bengal tiger named after one that was housed in the nearby Temple of the Tiger attraction, an interactive exhibit that was closed in 2010.

Rollbacks
A train may occasionally experience a rollback following a launch. A rollback occurs when the train fails to make it over the top of the tower and descends back down the side it was launched. Kingda Ka includes retractable magnetic brakes on its launch track to prevent a train from rolling back all the way into the loading station (and potentially colliding with the next about-to-be-launched train).

Incidents

On June 8, 2005, a bolt failed inside a trough through which the launch cable travels. This caused the liner to come loose, creating friction on the cable and preventing the train from accelerating to the correct speed. The cable rubbing against the trough caused sparks and shards of metal to fly out from the bottom of the train. The ride was closed for almost two months following the incident. Damage occurred to the launch cable, which was frayed and required replacement, including minor damage to seals and brake fins. The incident caused stress on a number of fins, and Six Flags did not have enough replacement fins. Extra brake fins had to be ordered from Intamin in Switzerland, and the ride had to undergo thorough testing following the repair. Kingda Ka reopened on August 4.

Kingda Ka was struck by lightning in May 2009 and suffered serious damage. The ride was closed for three months for repairs and reopened on August 21, 2009.

On August 27, 2011, Kingda Ka suffered unspecified damage shortly before Hurricane Irene, and Six Flags Great Adventure did not open. It is unknown whether additional damage occurred due to the storm, but the coaster was damaged to the extent that it could not run before Irene. Kingda Ka remained closed until the start of the 2012 operating season on April 5.

Shortly before 5:00p.m. on July 26, 2012, a young boy was sent to the hospital after suffering minor injuries from being struck by a bird during normal operation. The ride resumed normal operation shortly after the incident.

In 2019, a guest sued Six Flags and Intamin in U.S. federal court, claiming that tall riders could be subjected to "extreme speed and torqueing forces" and that the harnesses could also cause injuries. According to the guest, he had suffered multiple back injuries after riding Kingda Ka in 2017. Both Six Flags and Intamin filed a motion to dismiss the lawsuit, which was partially granted and partially denied in 2020.

Awards

Records

References

External links

Official Kingda Ka page
Kingda Ka Preview Article

Roller coasters operated by Six Flags
Roller coasters in New Jersey
Roller coasters introduced in 2005
Six Flags Great Adventure
2005 establishments in New Jersey